Harry O. Hoyt (6 August 1885 – 29 July 1961) was an American screenwriter and film director whose film career began in 1912, during the silent era. He graduated with a degree in literature from Yale University in 1910. His 1925 film The Lost World, based on the book by Arthur Conan Doyle, is notable as a pioneering effort in the use of stop-motion animation. His brother, actor Arthur Hoyt, also appeared in The Lost World.

In November 1912, he married the former Florence Stark in Norwich, Connecticut. Together they had a son, Devereux Gerrard Hoyt, and daughter Daryl Hoyt.

Partial filmography

 Dimples (1916)
 The Child of Destiny (1916)
 The Moth (1917)
 The Road to France (1918)
 Hitting the Trail (1918)
 The Beloved Blackmailer (1918)
 By Hook or Crook (1918)
 The Rough Neck (1919)
 A Broadway Saint (1919)
 Courage for Two (1919)
 Daredevil Jack (1920)
 The Rider of the King Log (1921)
 Pardon My French (1921)
 The Curse of Drink (1922)
That Woman (1922)
 The Woman on the Jury (1924)
 Sundown (1924)
 The Love Gamble (1925)
 The Unnamed Woman (1925)
 The Primrose Path (1925)
 The Lost World (1925)
 When Love Grows Cold (1926)
 The Belle of Broadway (1926)
 The Better Way (1926)
 The Adorable Deceiver (1926)
 Sweet Rosie O'Grady (1926)
 Wandering Girls (1927)
 The Kid Sister (1927)
 Painting the Town (1927)
 The Return of Boston Blackie (1927)
 Bitter Apples (1927)
 The Wizard (1927)
 The Clown (1927)
 The Count of Ten (1928)
 Good Morning, Judge (1928)
 The Passion Song (1928)
 The Rampant Age (1930)
 Second Honeymoon (1930)
 The Man from New Mexico (1932)
 Jungle Bride (1933)
 Clancy of the Mounted (1933)
 The Thrill Hunter (1933)
 The Fighting Ranger (1934)
 Headline Crasher (1936)
 Robin Hood, Jr. (1936)
 Jungle Menace (1937)
 The Last Stand (1938)
 Lady in the Death House (1944)
 A Fig Leaf for Eve (1944)
 The Missing Corpse (1945)

External links

References

1885 births
1961 deaths
American male screenwriters
Writers from Minneapolis
Film directors from Minnesota
Screenwriters from Minnesota
20th-century American male writers
20th-century American screenwriters
Yale University alumni